Melanalopha is a genus of moths belonging to the subfamily Olethreutinae of the family Tortricidae.

Species
Melanalopha lathraea Diakonoff, 1941

See also
List of Tortricidae genera

References

External links
tortricidae.com

Olethreutinae
Tortricidae genera
Taxa named by Alexey Diakonoff